Nicole "Nikki" Rene Glaser (born June 1, 1984) is an American stand-up comedian, actress, podcaster, radio host, and television host. She was the host of the television series Not Safe with Nikki Glaser, which premiered on Comedy Central and Much on February 9, 2016. She is the star of the 2022 reality show Welcome Home Nikki Glaser? on E!.

Early life 
Glaser was born on June 1, 1984, in Cincinnati, Ohio, the daughter of Julie E. (née Burke) and Edward J. Glaser. She has one sibling, a younger sister named Lauren. She has German and Irish ancestry. Glaser spent most of her childhood in St. Louis, Missouri. She graduated from Kirkwood High School and briefly attended the University of Colorado Boulder before transferring to, and graduating from, the University of Kansas with a degree in English Literature.

Career

Stand-up comedy 
Glaser started performing stand-up at age 18. Her first jokes were written in college. She recalled this in an interview with Rich Tupica in Revue magazine: "I remember it. I was a freshman in college and everyone in my dorm took over the cafeteria as like a study hall. I went in there and instead of studying I just looked at them, judged them and tried to think, 'What would Sarah Silverman say about these people?' I didn't know how to write jokes—I just knew the stand-ups I knew. I wrote from the perspective of my favorite stand-ups because I didn't know what my perspective was yet."

Since then, Glaser performed stand-up on The Tonight Show with Jay Leno, Conan, and two seasons of the reality series Last Comic Standing.

Her first feature stand-up special, Perfect, was on Comedy Central on April 9, 2016. Her second special, Bangin, premiered on Netflix on October 1, 2019.

Podcast and radio 
From 2011 to 2014, Glaser hosted a podcast with comedian Sara Schaefer called You Had To Be There.

In July 2013, Glaser performed on the radio show The Debaters, debating the 'Early to Bed' adage.

In March 2015, Glaser appeared on Giant Bomb's life-advice podcast, Danswers, talking about subjects such as her experience with co-host Dan Ryckert at college.

Glaser co-hosted the podcast We Know Nothing with comedian Phil Hanley and roommate/musician Anya Marina. We Know Nothing is a humorous relationship-based podcast that takes calls from listeners and attempts to give them love advice.

From January to October 2016, she hosted the companion podcast to her Comedy Central show Not Safe with Dan St. Germain and Brian Frange. Each episode they discussed sex and relationship issues as well as apples.

In February 2018, Glaser began hosting You Up? With Nikki Glaser, aired on Sirius XM's Comedy Central Radio. The show was dropped by Sirius XM on May 7, 2020, and continued as a podcast until its final episode on October 2, 2020.
Beginning in 2018, Glaser hosted multiple shows on Sirius XM channel 38 and on the Pop music channel 314.

Throughout 2018 and 2019, Glaser appeared on the Howard Stern channels on Sirius XM, including the roast of Ronnie the Limo driver and as a guest on the wrap-up show. On September 24, 2019, she was the feature guest with Howard Stern for a full-length interview.

Glaser appeared on The Joe Rogan Experience on October 3, 2018; October 3, 2019; and August 20, 2020.

The Nikki Glaser Podcast is hosted by Glaser and was co-hosted by fellow stand-up comedian Andrew Collin until Collin left the show in fall 2022. The first episode released on March 22, 2021.

Instagram 
Glaser has developed a substantial following on Instagram, making her the 26th most followed woman comedian on the platform in 2022. Glaser regards maintaining a social media presence to be demanding work for comedians, describing it as "a television show that never ends."

Television 

On January 29, 2013, Nikki & Sara Live, a weekly television series hosted by Glaser and Schaefer, premiered on MTV. The show was canceled on October 29, 2013, after two seasons.

On April 19, 2013, Glaser appeared in the pilot episode of Those Who Can't, a television series originally created by Amazon Studios. Glaser's character was replaced by Maria Thayer in 2015 when the series was picked up by TruTV.

Glaser appeared on MTV shows such as Money from Strangers, Awkward. After Show. You're Welcome., and Failosophy.

On June 2, 2015, Comedy Central approved a sex-themed talk show hosted by Glaser, titled Not Safe with Nikki Glaser. The show premiered on February 9, 2016. The show was picked up by 4Music in the United Kingdom. The show was cancelled in November 2016.

On September 5, 2016, Glaser appeared on the Comedy Central Roast of Rob Lowe as a Roaster. She appeared on the Comedy Central Roast of Bruce Willis on July 28, 2018.

On September 12, 2018, Glaser was announced as one of the celebrities competing on season 27 of Dancing with the Stars. Her professional partner was Gleb Savchenko. They were the first couple eliminated from the competition on September 25.

On February 6, 2019, Glaser appeared in the third episode of the third season of the celebrity rap-battle competition show Drop the Mic. She competed against fellow comedian Brad Williams, winning the battle.

In November 2019, the dating show Blind Date was revived by Bravo, with Glaser as the new host.

On July 30, 2020, Glaser appeared as a panelist on To Tell the Truth along with co-panelists Joel McHale, Oliver Hudson, and Vivica A. Fox. This was one of her eleven appearances on the show from 2017 through 2021.

Glaser is the host of the HBO Max dating reality television series FBOY Island, which first aired on July 29, 2021.

Glaser's life was featured in the E! reality series Welcome Home Nikki Glaser, which first aired May 1, 2022.

Glaser competed in season eight of The Masked Singer as "Snowstorm". After besting Chris Jericho as "Bride" and Adam Carolla as "Avocado" on "Comedy Roast Night" and Linda Blair as "Scarecrow" and Ray Parker Jr. as "Sir Bug a Boo" on "Fright Night", she was eliminated during the semi-finals, placing 3rd overall.

Film 
Glaser played a small role in Henry Phillips' 2009 film Punching the Clown. She also appeared as herself in Jordan Brady's 2010 documentary I Am Comic and its 2014 sequel, I Am Road Comic.

Glaser had a role in the Judd Apatow-directed film Trainwreck (2015) and I Feel Pretty (2018).

Personal life 
Glaser was in a relationship with Not Safe with Nikki Glaser co-creator Chris Convy. Convy and Glaser both reside in Greater St. Louis.

Sober from alcohol since 2012, she also quit smoking. She credits the writing of Allen Carr in her recovery.

Glaser is a long time animal activist and a vegan since 2016.

Filmography

References

External links 
 
 
 
 
 Interview with Rich Tupica for Revue
 Nikki Glaser at OkeyBlogging

1984 births
21st-century American actresses
21st-century American comedians
Actresses from St. Louis
American people of German descent
American film actresses
American women podcasters
American podcasters
American stand-up comedians
American television actresses
American women comedians
Comedians from Missouri
Late night television talk show hosts
Living people
People from Kirkwood, Missouri
University of Kansas alumni